The Social Development Network (SDN), formerly of Social Development Unit (SDU) and Social Development Service (SDS), is a governmental body under the Ministry of Social and Family Development of Singapore. It works closely with the community and commercial sectors to foster opportunities for singles to interact in social settings in Singapore. Besides coordinating and facilitating dating activities offered by the private sector, it also serves to educate the public on singlehood issues. Other responsibilities of the SDN include providing the necessary infrastructure and support for the dating industry, as well as to ensure the professionalism of dating agencies through an accreditation council that was formed in 2007.

SDN's initial role in the industry is to organise activities for its members to interact. In 2006, SDU changed focus to accreditate and funding private matchmaking and dating services agencies and projects. This was done in the hopes of creating a more vibrant dating scene and of allowing singles to have more options to interact with others of different educational levels.

Initiatives
A census conducted in 1980 revealed that a large number of highly educated women were still unmarried, despite being above 40 years of age. It was also noted that there was an inverse relationship between a person's educational level and the number of children he/she had. Dr Tony Tan—then Minister of Finance and Trade and Industry—attributed this finding to 2 factors: firstly, the cultural attitude among local men, who preferred to marry women with lower educational qualifications than themselves; and secondly, the preference among female university graduates to marry men who were better educated or at least of the same educational level as themselves. The SDU was thus formed in January 1984 to provide opportunities for single men and women to interact socially. Another objective of the unit was to encourage public discussion about the perceived problem of the large number of better-educated women remaining unmarried.

Since it was first established, SDU's target group was limited to university graduates. The government justified this elitist approach by announcing that they had identified graduates—and in particular the females among them—as a group which required assistance in terms of finding lifelong partners. According to the government, non-graduates did not seem to have any difficulty in finding partners. However, the Social Development Service (SDS) was set up a year after the SDU to promote marriages among non-graduates. On 28 January 2009, the SDU and SDS merged to become a single entity, tentatively named SDU-SDS, consolidating their respective resources and exposing their constituent members to the larger, merged database. It was renamed as Social Development Network or SDN on 16 October 2009.

Prior to the founding of the SDU, a Great Marriage Debate had been raging. During a speech made at the National Day rally in 1983, then-Prime Minister Lee Kuan Yew alleged that the phenomenon of graduates remaining single would result in a projected loss of about 400 talented people per year. This estimation was made on the basis that talent was not so much nurtured as it was conceived, as studies at that time had shown. Lee had also expressed worry that the dearth of children produced by graduate women would lead to the faltering of the economy and ultimately a decline in society. Although Lee had not explicitly stated that the SDU would be set up in response this problem, he had promised that tough measures would be taken by the government to curb the problem. The fact that the SDU was formed the following year has led many to perceive the debate to be the main reason behind the establishment of the unit and its exclusive focus.

Public response
Public reaction to the former SDU was initially that of disdain; graduate women were unhappy about their plight being addressed so prominently, while non-graduate women and their parents were upset at the government for dissuading graduate men from marrying them. In fact, there was an outcry by the public at large about the unfair use of taxpayers' money to subsidise leisure activities for graduates, especially since they already had a higher income. Some were also displeased about the fact that civil servants who were single were given three extra days of leave to go on SDU-organised cruises.

Besides those who treated the SDU with contempt, there were others who simply did not take the SDU seriously. One popular joke that was conceived in the early days was that 'SDU' also stood for 'Single, Desperate and Ugly'.

Results and success rates

Within the SDU
Results in the beginning were slow and the effectiveness of the SDU was questioned by both the public and members of parliament. From the time it was established in January 1984 to March 1985, only 2 marriages had taken place as a result of the SDU's efforts. This was not proportionate to the amount that SDU had spent on its activities, which came to $294,411.32 at the time. However, marriage figures began to increase from there. Between March and July 1985, another 4 couples were married. Since then, the number of SDU marriages has increased over the years. By the end of the first decade, the number of marriages as a result of SDU activities averaged about 1,000 a year. In 2003, SDU reported a significant increase in marriage figures for its members over the years, from 2,789 in 1999 to 4,050 in 2003. Over the first 2 decades since the SDU was first set up, SDU reported that more than 33,000 members were married (This includes Singaporeans who would have married irrespective of SDU).

On the national level
Despite the promising numbers reported by SDU, statistics at the national level do not mirror the trends within the SDU. According to the Singapore Department of Statistics, there was only a slight increase in marriages from 22,561 in year 2000 to 22,992 in year 2005. In fact, for those aged 30–34, the proportion remaining single had increased significantly between 2000 and 2005, as more people chose to delay marriage. In 2005, among citizens aged 30–34, the proportion that was single was 37 per cent for males and 26 per cent for females. As for those in the age range of 40–44, the proportion single at 2005 remained high at 15–17 per cent for males and females collectively.

The number of marriages has steadily increased over the years from 2004 (22,189) to 2009 (26,081) and crude marriage rate (per 1000 resident population) has been on the rise from 6.4 in 2007 to 6.6 in 2009. However, more singles are also marrying later. The mean age for first marriage has increased from 28.7 to 29.8 (males) and 26.2 to 27.5 (females) over the last 10 years.

Survey results
In addition to marriage and membership statistics, surveys are also conducted by the SDU from time to time to assess the effectiveness of the SDU, and its public education objective in particular. In mid 2006, 2,041 university undergraduates and polytechnic students were polled in an SDU survey on undergraduates' attitudes towards social interaction, dating and marriage. The data, which was collected during a series of face-to-face interviews, showed that, while nine out of ten would like to get married, only 35 per cent of them were certain about their intentions.

Earlier in the same year, SDU had conducted another survey which assessed attitudes of singles in general towards courtship and marriage. The survey, which included a variety of age groups, showed that 81 per cent of the 1,800 respondents indicated that they would like to get married. Yet, 74 per cent of the singles also mentioned that achieving success in work and studies was their top priority.

In the Survey on Singles' Attitudes towards Courtship and Marriage conducted by the Social Development Network (SDN) in 2009, about 80% of more than 1500 singles surveyed indicated their intention to get married. However, respondents also cited "not finding the right one or someone who met my expectations" as the top key reason for delaying marriage. Other top reasons cited included "not enough opportunities to socialize" and "lack of time" as career and other commitments were viewed as more/equally important, or as milestones to be achieved in life before they would think about marriage.

Activities and events
In the beginning, activities that the former SDU organised included personal-effectiveness workshops, computer courses, barbecues, dancing lessons, cruises/tours to the Maldives, Club Mediterrannee and Japan. SDU's policy then was that part of the fees for courses would be sponsored by the unit, while the full costs had to be borne by participants for cruises. However, it was discovered that the costs of cruises were significantly below the market rates and that participants were granted leave by their companies for the duration of the cruise.

Types of activities offered by SDU range from dating, wine & dine, self-enrichment, sports & recreation to travel and more. The range of activities offered has become much more extensive over the years. Self-enrichment activities consist mostly of dance lessons, though these span from Hip Hop to Exotic Dance to Ballroom Waltz. Other self-enrichment courses include wine appreciation, Pilates and baking classes. Overseas trips to many parts of Asia (such as China, Thailand, Malaysia, Vietnam and Nepal) are offered under the Travel category and the length of tours ranges from one day to 18 days, catering to different budgets and interests. SDU members are entitled to a subsidised rate for most activities, regardless of the nature of the event.

Since 2009, SDN has been working with different partners from the people, private and public sectors to create a broad array of opportunities for singles to meet and form meaningful relationships. Apart from collaborating with Government agencies under the Social Development Officers (SDO) Network to provide small interaction activities for single employees in the civil service, SDN also partners selected commercial and community organisations to facilitate larger-scale events for singles.

Membership
When SDU was first started, membership was free of charge and valid until the member registered his/her marriage, either at the Registry or under the Muslim law. Members paid only for the activities they registered for and even then, the costs were subsidised by the government. Many revisions have since been made to the various membership schemes, including an annual membership fee.

From October 2009, all membership schemes were removed and SDN extended its benefits to all resident singles without any fees. Currently, singles aged 20 and above who are Singapore Citizens and Permanent Residents can join the network's database to receive communications and information on dating, or register as a user to enjoy its online services, such as the chat function, forum discussion and personal ads, or to access information on events and other resources on dating and relationship.

Project Network
Project Network is an initiative that was started by the SDN in 2003 to provide funding for programmes helmed by local universities that promote social skills or provide socialisation opportunities for undergraduates. In order for projects to qualify for funding, they must satisfy one of the following two conditions:
 Opportunities for interaction between the two genders are maximised
 Undergraduates are taught social networking skills for personal development
The amount of funding that is provided depends on several factors, such as gender balance (the bare minimum being 60–40%), the originality of the programme, the degree of reach as well as the extent to which participants will benefit from the social interaction. As of 30 March 2007, the SDN had funded a total of about $275,000 worth of social activities.

Through Project Network, SDN has helped to co-fund orientation camps and student activities organised by the local universities to facilitate more gender-balanced social interaction opportunities on campus. Official student bodies may apply for the fund if they meet the criteria of the funding scheme, such as balanced gender ratio, meaningful interaction among opposite genders, etc.

References

External links
SDN website
SDN accredited agencies
Ministry of Social and Family Development website

1984 establishments in Singapore
Government agencies established in 1984
Organisations of the Singapore Government